Bo André Namtvedt (born 6 February 1967) is a Norwegian former professional racing cyclist. He won the Norwegian National Road Race Championship in 1991 and 1995.

References

External links
 

1967 births
Living people
Norwegian male cyclists
People from Hordaland
Sportspeople from Vestland